The Featherstones are a record production and songwriting team from Baltimore, Maryland consisted of Justin, Christopher, William, and Matthew Featherstone.

History
In 1997, the Featherstones created their production company with their father Lurenda Featherstone and began working with local artists Mystory and the singing group Everidae. While performing in a talent show hosted by The Baltimore Times at Security Square Mall, The Featherstones had the opportunity of meeting Sisqo of the singing group Dru Hill. It was there where he first heard them sing an original song written and produced by the Featherstones. He was so impressed that it led to the Featherstones first full production credit in 2002. "I Should Be..." both written and produced by the Featherstones was the lead single performed by American singing group Dru Hill from their third album Dru World Order. The single "I Should Be..." went on to reach number 25 on the Billboard Hot 100.

For years the Featherstones paid their dues, honed their craft, and weathered the inevitable storms of the music business. In 2013, they were contacted by their publisher to work with Kevin Gates on his album Stranger Than Fiction. While making the track, "Smiling Faces" they were trying to make something unique that stood out but wouldn't overwhelm it. They also just wanted to create a record that matched Gates' personalized and versatility. Ever since then, they have good chemistry and have been working with each other.

Production discography

References

External links
Official website

Hip hop in Maryland
Musical groups from Baltimore
African-American musical groups
American songwriting teams
Record production teams
Family musical groups
American hip hop record producers
American hip hop groups
Musical groups established in 1997